The de Havilland Canada DHC-4 Caribou (designated by the United States military as the CV-2 and later C-7 Caribou) is a Canadian specialized cargo aircraft with short takeoff and landing (STOL) capability. The Caribou was first flown in 1958 and although mainly retired from military operations, is still in use in small numbers as a rugged "bush" aircraft.

The design was further developed as the de Havilland Canada DHC-5 Buffalo, adding turboprop engines and other changes that further improved its short-field performance to the point where it competes with light aircraft even with a full load.

Design and development

The de Havilland Canada company's third STOL design was a big increase in size compared to its earlier DHC Beaver and DHC Otter, and was the first DHC design powered by two engines. The Caribou was similar in concept in that it was designed as a rugged STOL utility aircraft. The Caribou was primarily a military tactical transport that in commercial service found itself a small niche in cargo hauling. The United States Army ordered 173 in 1959 and took delivery in 1961 under the designation AC-1, which was changed to CV-2 Caribou in 1962.

The majority of Caribou production was destined for military operators, but the type's ruggedness and excellent STOL capabilities requiring runway lengths of only 1200 feet (365 metres) also appealed to some commercial users. U.S. certification was awarded on 23 December 1960. Ansett-MAL, which operated a single example in the New Guinea highlands, and AMOCO Ecuador were early customers, as was Air America (a CIA front in South East Asia during the Vietnam War era for covert operations). Other civil Caribou aircraft entered commercial service after being retired from their military users.

Today only a handful are in civil use.

The Turbo Caribou Program

PEN Turbo Aviation of Cape May, NJ, has undertaken the re-engineering of the DHC-4A Caribou to a turbine powered variant, designated DHC-4A Turbo Caribou. The conversion utilizes the PT6A-67T engines and Hartzell 5 Bladed HC-B5MA-3M Constant Speed/Reversing propellers. Overall performance has improved and "new" basic weight is reduced while maximum normal take-off weight remained at 28,500 lbs. Maximum payload is 10,000 lbs. Both Transport Canada (11/14/00) and Federal Aviation Administration (2/27/01) have issued Supplemental Type Certificates for the Turbo Caribou. As of Sept 17, 2014, only 3 air frames have gone through the conversion process. PEN Turbo has stockpiled dozens of air frames at their facility in NJ for possible future conversion. . PEN Turbo Aviation named their company after Perry E. Niforos, who died in the 1992 crash of an earlier turboprop Caribou converted by a different firm, NewCal Aviation.

Operational history

In response to a U.S. Army requirement for a tactical airlifter to supply the battlefront with troops and supplies and evacuate casualties on the return journey, de Havilland Canada designed the DHC-4. With assistance from Canada's Department of Defence Production, DHC built a prototype demonstrator that flew for the first time on 30 July 1958.

Impressed with the DHC4's STOL capabilities and potential, the U.S. Army ordered five for evaluation as YAC-1s and went on to become the largest Caribou operator. The AC-1 designation was changed in 1962 to CV-2, and then C-7 when the U.S. Army's CV-2s were transferred to the U.S. Air Force in 1967. U.S. and Australian Caribou saw extensive service during the Vietnam War.

The U.S. Army purchased 159 of the aircraft and they served their purpose well as a tactical transport during the Vietnam War, where larger cargo aircraft such as the Fairchild C-123 Provider and the Lockheed C-130 Hercules could not land on the shorter landing strips. The aircraft could carry 32 troops or two Jeeps or similar light vehicles. The rear loading ramp could also be used for parachute dropping (also, see Air America).

Under the Johnson-McConnell agreement of 1966, the Army relinquished the fixed wing Caribou to the United States Air Force in exchange for an end to restrictions on Army rotary wing operations. On 1 January 1967, the 17th, 57th, 61st, 92nd, 134th, and 135th Aviation Companies of the U.S. Army were inactivated and their aircraft transferred respectively to the newly activated 537th, 535th, 536th, 459th, 457th, and 458th Troop Carrier Squadrons of the USAF (This was Operation "Red Leaf"). On 1 August 1967 the "troop carrier" designations were changed to "tactical airlift".

Some U.S. Caribou were captured by North Vietnamese forces and remained in service with that country through to the late 1970s. Following the war in Vietnam, all USAF Caribou were transferred to Air Force Reserve and Air National Guard airlift units pending their replacement by the C-130 Hercules in the 1980s.

All C-7s have now been phased out of U.S. military service, with the last example serving again under U.S. Army control through 1985 in support of the U.S. Army's Golden Knights parachute demonstration team. Other notable military operators included Australia, Canada, India, Malaysia and Spain.

In September 1975, a group of 44 civilians, including armed supporters of the Timorese Democratic Union (UDT), commandeered a Royal Australian Air Force (RAAF) Caribou, A4-140, on the ground at Baucau Airport in the then Portuguese Timor, which was in the middle of a civil war. The Caribou had landed at Baucau on a humanitarian mission for the International Committee of the Red Cross. The civilians demanded that the RAAF crew members fly them to Darwin Airport (also RAAF Base Darwin) in Australia, which they did. After the Caribou arrived there, the Australian government detained the civilians for a short period, and then granted refugee visas to all of them. The Guardian later described A4-140 as "the only RAAF plane ever hijacked", and the incident as "one of the more remarkable stories in Australia’s military and immigration history".

The RAAF retired A4-140, by then its last Caribou, on 27 November 2009. The aircraft, which was manufactured in 1964, was donated to the Australian War Memorial, Canberra.

Civilian operations
After retirement from military use, several examples of the Caribou have been purchased by civilian operators for deployment in areas with small airfields located in rugged country with few or poor surface transport links.

Variants

DHC-4 Caribou
STOL tactical transport, utility transport aircraft.
CC-108
Royal Canadian Air Force designation for the DHC-4 Caribou.
YAC-1
This designation was given to five DHC-4 Caribou, sold to the United States Army for evaluation.
AC-1
United States Army designation for the first production run of 56 DHC-4 Caribou. Later redesignated CV-2A in 1962.
CV-2A
United States Army AC-1 redesignated in 1962.
CV-2B
This designation was given to a second production run of 103 DHC-4 Caribou, which were sold to the U.S. Army, with reinforced internal ribbing.
C-7A/B
These designations were applied to all 144 Caribou transferred to the U.S. Air Force by the U.S. Army.
DHC-4A Caribou
Similar to the DHC-4, but this version had an increased takeoff weight.
DHC-4T Turbo Caribou
A conversion of the baseline DHC-4 Caribou powered by the PWC PT6A-67T turboprop engines designed, test flown and certified by the Pen Turbo Aviation company.

Operators

Military operators
/ 
 Abu Dhabi Defence Forces Air Wing – Abu Dhabi operated five Caribou.
 United Arab Emirates Air Force

 Royal Australian Air Force – 18 ordered in 1963, with further orders for seven in 1964 and four more aircraft ordered individually between 1968 and 1971. Retired 2009.
 No. 35 Squadron RAAF 1966–2000 – transferred to No 38 Squadron RAAF.
 No. 38 Squadron RAAF 1964–2009 – all retired.
 RAAF Transport Flight Vietnam – seven operated from 1964 to 1971 and returned to Australia 1972

 Royal Canadian Air Force – nine delivered; retired from Canadian Forces in 1971.
 424 Transport and Rescue Squadron

 Cameroon Air Force – two delivered in 1971. The surviving Caribou was sold in 1987.
 Air Surveillance Service – Two ex-USAF C-7As delivered in the 1980s. Refurbished in July 2010 for the Fuerza Publica.

 Khmer Air Force. Operated unspecified number of C-123's. Several were seized by the Khmer Rouge in the Cambodian Civil War 

 Ghana Air Force – Ghana acquired eight new-build Caribou in 1963, which were operated until replaced by Fokker F.27-400Ms in 1975.

 Indian Air Force – India received 20 new build Caribou, supplementing them with four ex-Ghanaian Caribou in 1975.

 Imperial Iranian Air Force – One aircraft delivered to Iran. It was retired after Iran–Iraq War.

 Kenya Air Force – received six DHC-4As, operating the type from 1966 to 1987.

 Kuwait Air Force – received two aircraft in 1963.

Liberian Army – Two refurbished aircraft were delivered to the Air Reconnaissance Unit in 1989. The aircraft were destroyed during the civil war.

 Malaysian Air Force – retired their Caribou from active service.

 Sultanate of Oman Air Force

 Spanish Air Force – received 12 new Caribou later supplemented by 24 former United States Air Force C-7As. Final retirement 12 June 1991.

 Republic of Vietnam Air Force

 Swedish Air Force – operated one DHC-4 Caribou designated Tp 55 between 1962 and 1965 for evaluation purposes at Skaraborg Wing (F 7).

 Tanzanian Air Force

 Royal Thai Police – used three DHC-4A from 1966 to 2005.

 Uganda Police Force Air Wing

 United States Army
 United States Air Force

 Vietnam People's Air Force – captured several ex-VNAF airplanes.

 Zambian Air Force – operated four Caribou.

Civil operators

 Ansett-MAL – operated one aircraft in the New Guinea highlands.

 La Sarre Air Services
 acquired C-GVGX in 1977 (delivered 1961) and unknown status after 1981 when Propair formed from merger of La Sarre Air Services (used in El Salvador to Nicaragua 1986)

 Air Vigillance Service

 AMOCO Ecuador
 Anglo-Ecuador Oilfields
 Aerolíneas Cóndor of SA

 Air Inter Gabon

 Municipal Government of Puncak Regency
 Trigana Air

 New Cal Aviation

 Garamut Exploration Services
 Vanimo Trading

 Air Asia

 Air America
 Bannock Aerospace
 Chieftain Air
 Deutsche Aviation
 Environmental Research Institute of Michigan
 Fowler Aeronautical Service
 H A T Aviation Inc.
 John Woods Inc.
 New Cal Aviation
 Pen Turbo Aviation
 Flightworks

Aircraft on display

Australia
Airworthy
 A4-210 – DHC-4 airworthy with the Historical Aircraft Restoration Society, Illawarra Regional Airport, Albion Park, New South Wales. Now carries civil registration.
 A4-234 – DHC-4 airworthy with the Historical Aircraft Restoration Society, Illawarra Regional Airport, Albion Park, New South Wales. Now carries civil registration.
On display
 A4-134 - DHC-4 on display at The Army Museum Bandiana, Bandiana, Victoria.
 A4-140 – DHC-4 in storage at the Treloar Technology Centre of the Australian War Memorial in Mitchell, Australian Capital Territory. This airframe was gifted to the museum in November 2009.
 A4-152 – DHC-4 on static display at the Royal Australian Air Force Museum in Point Cook, Victoria. This airframe was gifted to the museum in November 2009.
 A4-159 - DHC-4 forward section at the Queensland Air Museum in Caloundra, Queensland.
 A4-173 – DHC-4 on static display at the Queensland Air Museum in Caloundra, Queensland (fitted with the wings and tail off A4-164).
 A4-195 – DHC-4 with the Australian Army Flying Museum in Oakey, Queensland.
 A4-199 – DHC-4 gate guard at RAAF Base Townsville in Townsville, Queensland.
 A4-204 - DHC-4 on display at National Vietnam Veterans Museum, Phillip Island, Victoria.
 A4-225 - DHC-4 on display at South Australian Aviation Museum, Port Adelaide, South Australia.

 A4-228 - DHC-4 on display at Caboolture Warplane and Flight Heritage Museum, Caboolture Airfield, Caboolture, Queensland.
 A4-231 - DHC-4 on display at National Vietnam Veterans Museum, Phillip Island, Victoria.
 A4-236 – DHC-4 on static display at the Aviation Heritage Center, RAAF Base Amberley, Queensland.
 A4-275 - DHC-4 stored at Historical Aircraft Restoration Society, Albion Park, New South Wales.
 A4-299 - DHC-4 on static display at Evans Head Memorial Aerodrome Heritage Aviation Association Museum at Evans Head, New South Wales.

Costa Rica
On display
 MSP002 - DHC-4 on static display at Daniel Oduber Quiros International Airport, Liberia, Costa Rica

India
On display
 BM769 – DHC-4 on static display at the Eastern Air Command Headquarters in Shillong, Meghalaya
 BM774 – DHC-4 on static display at the Indian Air Force Museum in Palam, Delhi.

Malaysia
On display
 M21-04 – DHC-4A on static display at the Royal Malaysian Air Force Museum in Sungai Besi, Kuala Lumpur.
 A ex-RMAF DHC-4A on static display at the Malaysian Army Museum at Port Dickson, Negeri Sembilan.

Spain
On display
 T.9-9 – DHC-4A on display in San Torcuato, La Rioja.
 T.9-10 – DHC-4A on display in Fuenlabrada, Madrid.
 T.9-23 – C-7A on static display at the Villanubla Air Base in Villanubla, Castile and León. This airframe was previously operated by the 37th Transport Wing.
 T.9-25 – C-7A on static display at the Museo del Aire in Madrid. This airframe was previously operated by the former 37th Transport Wing.

Thailand
On display
 12271 – DHC-4A on display at Camp Naresuan, Hua Hin District, Thailand.

United States

Airworthy
 2 – DHC-2 airworthy with John K. Bagley of Rexburg, Idaho.
 62-4149 – CV-2B airworthy at the Cavanaugh Flight Museum in Dallas, Texas.

On display
 57-3079 – YC-7A on static display at the U.S. Army Transportation Museum at Joint Base Langley–Eustis near Newport News, Virginia.
 57-3080 – YC-7A on static display at the United States Army Aviation Museum at Fort Rucker near Daleville, Alabama.
 57-3082 – YC-7A (4th of original 5 on order) on static display at Dyess Air Force Base, Abilene, TX Linear Air Park. The U.S.Army accepted delivery at the DeHavilland plant in Toronto, Ontario during late November, early December 1959. On 31 December 1966 this aircraft and equipment was transferred from U.S. Army ownership to U.S. Air Force ownership. The aircraft served the U.S. Air Force at headquarters, U.S.Air Force Logistics Command at Wright Petterson AFB, Dayton, Ohio. until 1975. It was then transferred to Pope AF at Fayetteville, NC to serve the "Golden Knights" parachute team as a jump aircraft. Later, when Dyess was seeking a C-7 for display, they sent a team down to Pope AFB and secured this particular machine in 1992. The 463rd Maintenance Squadron deployed to Pope AFB to break this aircraft down so it could be brought to Dyess by a C5B Galaxy. It was officially dedicated here 2 May 1992.
 57-3083 – YC-7A on static display at the 82nd Airborne Division War Memorial Museum at Fort Bragg near Fayetteville, North Carolina.
 60-3767 – C-7A on static display at the Travis Air Force Base Heritage Center at Travis Air Force Base near Fairfield, California.
 62-4188 – C-7A on static display at the New England Air Museum in Windsor Locks, Connecticut.
 62-4193 – C-7A on static display at the National Museum of the United States Air Force in Dayton, Ohio.
 63-9756 – C-7B on static display at the Museum of Aviation in Warner Robins, Georgia.
 63-9757 – C-7B on static display at the Hill Aerospace Museum at Hill Air Force Base near Ogden, Utah.
 63-9760 – C-7A on static display at the Air Mobility Command Museum at Dover Air Force Base near Dover, Delaware.
 63-9719 – C-7B stored at the Texas Air & Space Museum in Amarillo, Texas.
 63-9765 – C-7B in storage at the Air Force Flight Test Center Museum at Edwards Air Force Base near Edwards, California. Last known Caribou delivered to U.S. Army, in U.S. Army Golden Knights markings.

Specifications (DHC-4A)

See also

References

Notes

Bibliography
 Andrade, John. Militair 1982. London: Aviation Press, 1982. .
 The C-7A Caribou Association
 Caribou Roster  deHavilland Caribou (DHC-4) and Buffalo (DHC-5) website.
 "Caribou to Bow Out Early". Air International, Vol. 76. No. 4, April 2009, p. 5.
 Green, William. Macdonald Aircraft Handbook. London: Macdonald & Co. (Publishers) Ltd., 1964.

 Henley, Don and Ken Ellis. "Globetrotting Reindeers: De Havilland Canada's Caribou – an Airlift Legend". Air Enthusiast, No. 74, March/April 1998, pp. 20–33. .
 Hotson, Fred W. The de Havilland Canada Story. Toronto: CANAV Books, 1983. .
 Kuwait Air Force (KAF) entry at the Scramble (magazine) website:
 Malaysian Forces Overview entry at the Scramble magazine website.
 Royal Air Force of Oman entry at the Scramble magazine website.
 Soupart, Roger. "Adios Muchachas!". Air Enthusiast, No. 45, March–May 1992. pp. 44–51. .
 Taylor, John W.R. (ed.). Jane's All The World's Aircraft 1971–72. London: Janes's Yearbooks, 1971. .

External links

 The C-7A Caribou Association
 "Handling the DHC-4 Caribou" a 1959 Flight article
   "The brave caribous in the dark: How a transport aircraft was converted into a bomber",  The Probe, 17 December 2021.
 

 
DHC-4
1950s Canadian civil utility aircraft
1950s Canadian military transport aircraft
High-wing aircraft
STOL aircraft
Cruciform tail aircraft
Aircraft first flown in 1958
Twin piston-engined tractor aircraft